The 1974 1000 Lakes Rally (formally the 24nd  Jyväskylän Suurajot) was the third round of the shortened 1974 World Rally Championship season. It took place between 2 and 4 August 1974. The 1000 Lakes Rally didn't use special stages at this time to decide a winner. Instead all of the route was competitive -  with the driver with the lowest accumulation of penalty time between time controls being declared the winner.

Report 
The 1000 Lakes Rally being the third round of the World Rally Championship
The Race have 36 stages and won by Hannu Mikkola.
The system of points for 1st to 10th is the Ford take 20 points for the Hannu Mikkola and the 2nd, the 3rd Markku Alén of Fiat take 12 points, Stig Blomqvist and Simo Lampinen of Saab take 10 points, the 6th and 7th not take points by the 3rd and 5th, in this case the 8th Anders Kulläng take 3 points, the 9th not take points, and the 10th [[Björn
Waldegård]] take 1 point.

Results

Championship Standings after event

References

External links 
 Official website of the World Rally Championship
 1974 1000 Lakes Rally on Rallye-info.com

1974 World Rally Championship season
1974 in Finnish sport